Přemek Podlaha (June 13, 1938 − December 23, 2014) was a television personality from the Czech Republic.

For almost three decades he hosted a TV and radio magazine show about gardening and lifestyle. 

In 1962 Podlaha, studied journalism at the Faculty of Arts of Charles University.  But he began to form a relationship with the garden soon after his studies, when he started publishing the Agricultural Magazine on the then Czechoslovak television.

In addition he published journals, wrote several books, recorded a few songs with lyrics about gardening and appeared often in advertisements.

References

External links

 Very short biography (in Czech)

Czech television personalities
Gardening television
1938 births
2014 deaths